Oscar Salazar may refer to:

 Oscar Salazar (baseball) (born 1978), Major League Baseball infielder
 Óscar Salazar (taekwondo) (born 1977), practitioner of taekwondo
 Óscar Lara Salazar (born 1962), Mexican politician